Pierre Thiriet (born 20 April 1989 in Épinal) is a French racing driver. He finished eighth overall and second in the LMP2 class of the 2012 24 Hours of Le Mans and won the European Le Mans Series in the LMP2 class in 2012.

Career
After competing in karting in 2003–04, Thiriet began racing in the Eurocup Mégane Trophy in 2009. Driving for TDS Racing, he finished fifth in the standings. Remaining with TDS for the 2010 season, Thiriet finished second in the standings behind teammate Nick Catsburg with two race wins.

Thiriet followed TDS into sportscar racing in 2011, contesting the Le Mans Series in the LMP2 class in an Oreca 03 shared with Mathias Beche and Jody Firth. The trio won the rounds at Spa and Estoril and finished fourth in the final drivers' standings. Thiriet also contested the 2011 24 Hours of Le Mans in a Luxury Racing Ferrari 430, but the car failed to finish.

For 2012, LMP2 became the top class of the renamed European Le Mans Series. Partnering Beche, Thiriet and TDS won the opening round of the season at Paul Ricard and the season finale at Road Atlanta, securing his first major championship victory. For the 2012 24 Hours of Le Mans they were joined by Christophe Tinseau and the car finished eighth overall and second in LMP2.

Thiriet is the son of Claude Thiriet, the founder of the French frozen food company Thiriet.

24 Hours of Le Mans results

References

External links

1989 births
Living people
Sportspeople from Épinal
French racing drivers
Eurocup Mégane Trophy drivers
European Le Mans Series drivers
24 Hours of Le Mans drivers
FIA World Endurance Championship drivers
Blancpain Endurance Series drivers
24 Hours of Spa drivers
Signature Team drivers
G-Drive Racing drivers
TDS Racing drivers
20th-century French people
21st-century French people
United States F4 Championship drivers